Mulu Kinfe Hailemichael (born 12 January 1999) is an Ethiopian cyclist, who currently rides for UCI ProTeam .

Major results
2018
 3rd Overall Tour of Rwanda
2019
 5th Overall Giro della Valle d'Aosta
1st  Mountains classification
2020
 8th Overall Tour du Rwanda
1st Stage 2

References

External links

1999 births
Living people
Ethiopian male cyclists
People from Tigray Region
21st-century Ethiopian people